Batu Galing is an administrative village at Curup Tengah district, Rejang Lebong, Indonesia.  Batu Galing has a total area of 0.24 square kilometres (0.09 square miles) and with total population of 1492.
Formerly Batu Galing subdistrict was a part of Talang Rimbo Lama subdistrict, this subdistrict was established in 2006. For the people of Curup city and Rejang Lebong this area was known as Perumnas Batu Galing or Old Perumnas.

References

External links
Profil Desa dan Kelurahan Kementerian Dalam Negeri Republik Indonesia (Indonesian website)

Populated places in Bengkulu